Christian Seznec (born 19 November 1952, in Brest) was a French professional road bicycle racer.

Major results

1975
Le Quillo
1978
Concarneau
Tour de France:
Winner stage 17
5th place overall classification
1979
Tour de France:
Winner stage 12
1980
Tour de France:
6th place overall classification

External links 

Official Tour de France results for Christian Seznec

French male cyclists
1952 births
Living people
French Tour de France stage winners
Sportspeople from Brest, France
Cyclists from Brittany